Marek Mirosław Saganowski (born 31 October 1978) is a Polish professional football manager and former player who played as a striker, currently in charge of II liga club Pogoń Siedlce.

In a much-travelled career, he represented clubs in Poland, Germany, the Netherlands, Portugal, France, England, Denmark and Greece.

Saganowski made his full international debut for Poland in 1996, earned 35 caps and scored 5 goals for his national side. He represented the nation at UEFA Euro 2008.

Playing career

Poland
Saganowski was born in Łódź, Poland and began his career in 1994 with his local club ŁKS Łódź, playing there for six seasons, with brief loan spells at Feyenoord in 1996 and with Hamburger SV in early 1997. Neither of these loan spells was a particular success and he returned to ŁKS in the summer of 1997 to rebuild his career. In 1997–98, he made 22 appearances for ŁKS Łódź, but his career was interrupted by a serious motor-cycle accident in 1998 following which he was unable to walk. He slowly recovered from the injuries, and returned to playing for ŁKS Łódź, although his goal-scoring abilities did not recover initially.

He moved to Wisła Płock in 2000 and then to Odra Wodzisław the following year. He switched to Legia Warsaw in January 2003 where he returned to form, scoring 41 goals in 67 games. In 2005, he moved to Portugal's Vitoria Guimaraes where he notched 12 goals in his one season there.

Troyes
At the beginning of the 2006–07 season, he moved to French club Troyes AC for £1 million, but only made six substitute appearances for them and failed to score, spending most of his time in the reserves.

Southampton

Saganowski joined Southampton initially on loan on 30 January 2007 until the end of the 2006–07 season. He made a successful start to his Saints career, scoring ten goals in his first 13 league games including a hat-trick in the 6–0 defeat of Wolverhampton Wanderers on 31 March 2007. His goals helped lift the Saints out of the doldrums they were in at the end of January and push them into a play-off position. Although he featured in both play-off games he failed to score despite hitting the post as Saints went out to Derby County in a penalty shoot-out.

He was signed on a permanent contract in the summer of 2007, but struggled for goalscoring form in the 2007–08 season, although he scored a vital goal against Sheffield United on the final day of the season helping to keep Southampton in the Championship. This was his first goal since the opening day of the season.

Aalborg BK
On 7 August 2008, Saganowski moved on loan for the season to the Danish SAS league club Aalborg BK. He made his debut for Aalborg on 13 August 2008 in the home match against FBK Kaunas in the Champions League third round qualifier, first leg. His first goal for Aalborg was in the Danish Cup against Brønshøj BK on 27 September 2008.

In total he scored five goals in 24 league and cup matches for Aalborg, of which three goals came in 13 league appearances. He played in all six of his club's Champions League group matches, including two against Manchester United and two against Celtic. Saganowski scored once in the Champions League, in a 6–3 defeat in Spain against Villarreal. His last match for Aalborg was the 2–2 Champions League draw at Old Trafford in December.

Return to Southampton
He returned to Southampton on 1 January 2009, and scored six times in his first seven matches following his recall to the side, against Doncaster Rovers, Norwich City and twice against Swansea City and Preston North End. He has stated his loyalty to Southampton and announced he wants to finish his career there. He said "I love the area, the city, the football club, and most of all the fans. I believe they are the greatest supporters in the country".

Atromitos Peristeriou
On 26 January 2010, Atromitos Peristeriou signed the Polish forward from Southampton until 2012 on a free transfer.

ŁKS Łódź
In June 2011, he re-joined his first club ŁKS Łódź on a two-year contract.

International career
He has also appeared 33 times for the Poland national football team, scoring five goals. He made appearances in all three of Poland's games at Euro 2008, including two starts.

To this day, he is the only Polish footballer to score for a two-digit score, when he scored the goal against San Marino in Poland's 10–0 victory.

Poland goals

Honours
ŁKS Łódź
 Ekstraklasa: 1997–98

AaB
 Danish Superliga: 2007–08

Legia Warsaw
 Ekstraklasa: 2012–13, 2013–14, 2015–16
 Polish Cup: 2012–13, 2014–15, 2015–16

References

External links

 
 
 
  

1978 births
Living people
Footballers from Łódź
Polish footballers
Association football forwards
ŁKS Łódź players
Feyenoord players
Hamburger SV players
Wisła Płock players
Odra Wodzisław Śląski players
Legia Warsaw players
Vitória S.C. players
ES Troyes AC players
Southampton F.C. players
AaB Fodbold players
Poland international footballers
English Football League players
Eredivisie players
Danish Superliga players
UEFA Euro 2008 players
Polish expatriate footballers
Polish expatriate sportspeople in the Netherlands
Expatriate footballers in the Netherlands
Polish expatriate sportspeople in Germany
Expatriate footballers in Germany
Polish expatriate sportspeople in Portugal
Expatriate footballers in Portugal
Polish expatriate sportspeople in France
Expatriate footballers in France
Polish expatriate sportspeople in England
Expatriate footballers in England
Polish expatriate sportspeople in Denmark
Expatriate men's footballers in Denmark
Ekstraklasa players
Primeira Liga players
Bundesliga players
Motor Lublin managers
MKP Pogoń Siedlce managers
Polish football managers
II liga managers